Filipino cartoon and animation, also known as Pinoy cartoon and animation, is a body of original cultural and artistic works and styles applied to conventional Filipino storytelling, combined with talent and the appropriate application of classic animation principles, methods, and techniques, which recognizes their relationship with Filipino culture, comics, and films. It also delves into relying on traditional and common Filipino "sense of going about things" or manner of coping with Filipino life and environment.

Historical background

First Filipino cartoon

Original Filipino cartoons began with the publication of local comic books, known as komiks. During the late 1920s, Filipino writer Romualdo Ramos and Filipino visual artist Antonio “Tony” Velasquez created the cartoon character named Kenkoy. It appeared in the pages of the Tagalog-language Liwayway magazine as a weekly comic strip entitled Mga Kabalbalan ni Kenkoy or "Kenkoy's antics". Because of its popularity it became a Filipino icon and was translated into other regional languages in the Philippines. Since then, other cartoon characters were created by other Filipino comic book artists. The creation of Kenkoy also influenced the works of Filipino musicians such as Nicanor Abelardo (the product was the libretto Hay Naku Kenkoy or "Oh, My Gosh, Kenkoy!"), and the emergence of atypical Kenkoy-like pronunciation of English words which came to be known as “Kenkoy’s English” and “Carabao English”. This influence of Kenkoy gave birth to original Filipino language vocabulary, such as Barok (also became a stand-alone cartoon character), Jeproks, and Pinoy, the colloquial form of the word Filipino. Kenkoy also survived the arrival of the Japanese during World War II. Kenkoy became a tool of the Japanese occupiers for disseminating health programs. Other Filipinos who excelled in the Philippine komiks and cartoon industry are Francisco Coching, and Alex Niño.

Filipino animation pioneer
The first Filipino-made cartoon for television was Panday, created by Gerry Garcia in the 1980s based on the comic book character of the same name produced by Carlo J. Caparas. RPN-9 began airing in November 1986. Garcia is considered as the pioneer of Filipino animation industry. From 1995 to 1997, Garcia also brought into life Adarna (1997), the first Filipino full-length animation movie, based on the story of the Adarna bird. Garcia wrote the story and directed Adarna under FLT Productions and Guiding Light Productions. Adarna received recognition from the Metro Manila Film Festival on December 27, 1997, as the first animated movie in Philippine cinema. In 1998, it was also included in the Asian Collection of Japan’s 7th Hiroshima Animation Festival.

Garcia’s creation was later followed by the second Filipino full-length animated feature film, Urduja (2008), a Philippine animation product using a mixture of digital and traditional animation techniques.

Other Filipino cartoonists
Another known Filipino pioneer cartoonist was Larry Alcala, who was known for his cartoon series named Slice of Life. One more was Alfredo P. Alcala who, apart from creating several comic strips in the Philippines, worked for American comic book firms, namely DC Comics, Dark Horse Comics, and Marvel Comics. Another recognized Filipino animator is Benedict Carandang, the co-founder of Tuldok Animation Studios and recipient of the United Kingdom’s British Council’s 2008 Young Screen Entrepreneur. Carandang produced the animation of Ramon del Prado's short-film entitled, Libingan or “The Burial”, an animated cartoon inspired by the hanging coffins of Sagada, Mountain Province.

Filipino animation industry

Beginnings
The Philippine animation industry traces its origins back to the 1980s. Being one of the earlier players in the industry, with the local Philippine animation industry scene being around for already twenty years, the Philippines is considered one of the stronger Asian players in the realm of animation globally. The rising need for outsourced services, mainly from the United States and Europe, caused the continued flourishing of animation studios in the country. These animation studios were for the most part export-driven and catered mostly to the demands of these foreign animators. Among the first few animation studios in the country include Burbank Animation Inc., Asian Animation, and Fil-Cartoons. The clientele of Philippine studios supply the demand coming from the United States and Europe. Today, the country is regarded as one of the main and “stronger players” in outsourced and global animated cartoon production. The Philippines is second to India in providing services related to business outsourcing.

Progress and development
Having originated from Filipino-made cartoons inspired by komiks, the Philippine animation industry later found opportunities abroad on big animated projects. In previous projects of DreamWorks Studios in Los Angeles, the Filipino animator Ronnie Del Carmen was chosen as the artistic supervisor for works like The Prince of Egypt and The Road to El Dorado.

In 1983, Burbank Animation Inc., an Australian company, established a branch in the Philippines. Optifex International, Inc., originally called AsianAnimation, was one of the first Filipino owned corporations. In 1988, another large company known as Fil-Cartoons was established.

Other major studios in the country have emerged including Toei Animation, a Japanese company with a Philippine subsidiary that has worked on G.I. Joe, Transformers, Dragon Ball, Sailor Moon and Nadja, and Top Peg Animation and Creative Studio, Inc. which is a Philippine-owned company which has worked on Disney television series including 101 Dalmatians: The Series, The Legend of Tarzan, Kim Possible, and Hercules (1998). In 2009, Toei Animation and Top Draw were part of the 2010-11 Philippines Top 15000 Corporations as well as four members of the Association Council of the Philippines.

Industry trend
According to the 1994 Census of Establishments, there is a total of 4609 film and animation establishments in the country, with a combined gross revenue of PHP 1.796 billion. A significant number of these firms are located in Metro Manila, the national capital region of the Philippines, amounting to about 34.43% of the total film and animation firms in the country.

The employment rate in the Philippine animation sector experienced continued rates of increase from 2004 to 2008, with an annual average rate of increase of 29.10% per year from 3000 workers in 2004 to 8000 workers in 2008. The highest employment growth rate occurred in 2005, increasing the workforce by 50%. However, a sudden drop in total industry employment growth rate was observed in 2007, from 44.4% in 2006 to 7.7% in 2007.

Due to having a low-skill labor force, the Philippines largely relies on the traditional cel-animated production. Only countries like the US and Japan are able to distribute CGI animation to the global market mainly because of the high cost of post-production and distribution of producing CGI.

According to the Animation Council of the Philippines, the number of animation firms in the country has been steadily increasing, with the number of locally owned animation firms increasing at a higher rate than that of foreign-owned animation firms from 1980 to 2011. From 3,000 in 2004, the estimated number of employed artists in the industry has jumped to 10,000 as of 2010. In order to provide students with the proper training for potential careers in the field of animation, government agencies such as the Commission on Higher Education (CHED), Department of Education (DepEd), and the Technical Education and Skills Development Authority (TESDA) have taken actions in creating “regulatory standards for academic requirements associated with two-year animation courses” and “training regulations, courseware, and assessment” for schools offering animation courses.

Though both have long been considered competitors in the global information technology industry, India is admittedly way ahead of the Philippines in terms of size and manpower. Instead of competing against each other, Aninash Gupta, minister of the Embassy of India, encourages “coopetition”, which means cooperation among competitors. By complementing their strengths, both Philippine and Indian animation companies could enter joint ventures to be able to be at par with other Asian countries, like Singapore and Hong Kong, and garner larger parts of the market including the US. In a press conference, Mr. Gupta and Filipino economist Bernardo Villegas urged for the formation of partnerships and business opportunities that the Philippines and India could explore.

Local animation studios/companies

Toon City Animation
Toon City Animation began as a traditional animation studio that rendered services for Walt Disney Television Animation. It has since grown into becoming the preferred subcontracting animation facility in Asia. The studio is the animation production house for major clients such as Walt Disney Television Animation, Universal Animation Studios, Warner Bros. Animation, and MoonScoop Productions.

Currently, Toon City belongs to an exclusive list of studios, as it has been recognized with the Emmy award of Outstanding Animated Children's Program in 2010, for "Curious George." The studio offers services such as pre-production, storyboarding, Digital 2D, Traditional/Tradigital Animation, Flash, and After Effects.

Toei Animation Philippines Inc.
Toei Animation Philippines Inc. is a 100% subsidiary of Toei Animation Co., Ltd. in Japan, usually referred to as the Disney of the Orient. Toei Phils. began in 1986 via a Memorandum of Agreement between Toei Animation Co. Ltd and EEI Corp. The studio boasts a total of 200 experienced employees, and has a production capacity of about 60,000 drawings per month.

The company began the digitization of its animation process in the year 1997. It started with Digital Ink and Paint and Special Effects production. In the year 2000, it became the first Philippine animation studio to fully digitize its In-betweening process. On July 1, 2006, the studio started its 3D Computer Graphics production, which also serve the requirements of Toei Animation Co., Ltd.

Philippine Animation Studio Inc.
Philippine Animation Studio Inc. (PASI) is an animation studio established in 1991. It has worked with at least 700 half-hour shows in its library and has worked with several clients such as Nelvana, KKC&D and Warner Bros. Inc. PASI is known for being a producer of traditional 2D animation and Adobe Flash. It is one of the oldest known studios to have specialized in the latter.

ASI Studios
ASI Studios is a Manila-based studio and provides full animation services. The studio is known for having animated the popular television series "George of the Jungle," among other renowned TV series. The studio was brought forth from a collaboration between Manila-based Synergy88 and Singapore's August Media Holdings. It is situated in Quezon City, Metro Manila.

The studio boasts 130 specialized artists and technicians accompanied by experience in 2D, Traditional Cut Out, and Paperless Animation. ASI works primarily on long format 2D animation. A majority of the studio's projects involve work scopes that concern scene layouts, composited animations, storyboards, and designs.

Top Draw Animation
Top Draw Animation is a Manila-based studio established in 1999 by Wayne Dearing. They provide a full range of pre-production and production services. Their pre-production services include story boards, location design, model and prop design, background color and color styling. For production, they offer Flash animation and Toon Boom Harmony.

The company has worked with several clients such as DHX Media, SLR Production and Brain Power Studio.

World Anime Networks
World Anime Networks, Inc. (WAN) is a Japanese Animation Studio founded by Ryoji Kawaguchi. WAN Philippine branch was established in Baguio City on October 26, 2017, and, though working on titles with other companies, is mostly doing work for the Japanese animation studio Feel.

Outsourcing services
In previous years, cartoons were primarily developed and produced in the United States. Recently, approximately 90 percent of animations are created in Asia, including India, China and Taiwan, North and South Korea, Singapore and the Philippines. The current trend is that American animation companies are setting up more animation studios in the Philippines. Many animated cartoons are currently created and subcontracted in studios of Disney, Marvel, Warner Bros., Hanna-Barbera, Cartoon Network and Universal Studios in the Philippines. An example is the Filipino company called Fil-Cartoons, a subsidiary of Hanna Barbera and Turner Broadcasting. Reasons for choosing the Philippines by such American animation producers include the influence of Western humor, nuances, and culture to Filipinos, the existence of talented Filipino artists, an established local animation industry, the emergence of the business process outsourcing industry in the country, and cheaper production costs. Compared with India where outsource studios are supported by India's profitable software industry the Philippines are ahead in 2D animation due to their close ties to the Western mindset. Producing animated cartoons is also cheaper than in other Asian countries. An example of an American comic book superhero for Marvel Comics drawn by a Filipino is Wolverine. The trend in the industry is paving the way for making the Philippines as the world's “cartoon capital”.<ref name=CNN>Ressa, Maria. Filipino Animators in 'toon' with the Times and CNN Showbiz Index, CNN, Cable News Network, October 14, 1995</ref> Filipino cartoonists are also known illustrators of Japanese-style cartoons called anime and manga.
Analyses of the economy of the Philippines state that its services is what the country is best at. Reasons given include the country's English-language competence, competitively priced labor for a range of middle-level technical skills, familiarity with American cultural norms, and widespread international employment experience. Filipino artists have the capacity to draw 24-30 drawings a day, which equates to 2–3 seconds of animation.

The animation industry began in the early 1950s to promote products through animation. Some examples of popular cartoonists are Jerry Navarro, Larry Alcala, Vicente Penetrante and Jose Zabala Santos. During the Marcos period back in the 1960s, animation become one of the regime's tools for propaganda for patriotism. In 1979, The Adventures of Lam-Ang was produced, which was a 6-minute animated feature that was based on the folklore of the same name.

The Philippines Department of Trade and Industry has ranked animation among the five priority industries for promotion under the IT-service sector roadmap. The DTI led a five-company delegation to the 2002 International Animated Film Market in Annecy, France, the world's largest show, and promoted Philippine animation companies in the 19th International Film and Program Market for TV, Video, Cable and Satellite in Cannes, France. In February 2003, animation companies attended the local “e-Services Philippines: IT Outsourcing Conference and Exhibition”. On this occasion DTI and the Animation Council of the Philippines also launched an annual amateur competition – Animazing Shorts – with assistance from Intel Philippines and the local distributor of the Maya animation Software.

Foreign ownership or leadership is considerable, and has provided Philippines-based studios with the contacts, credibility (to foreign buyers, including both production studios and TV chains), finance, and production and creative expertise. The major studios include:
Toei Animation is the Japanese company that hasdecided to entrust 60 percent of its total animation work to its Philippine subsidiary.
Top Peg Animation and Creative Studio Inc., a 100-percent Philippine-owned company 
Top Draw, which is a recent entrant that is highly regarded and which does international work.
Philippines Animation Studios (PASI), which is funded by a listed Malaysian company, and which has a strong core team of animators.
Holy Cow! Animation, a studio specializing in 3D (three-dimensional) digital animation.
Along with these, there are numerous other smaller companies.

In recent years, some of the major studios that had been captive to or owned by larger foreign studios have now branched out to seek work on their own worldwide through their networks.

List of Philippine animated feature films
Over the years, majority of Filipino-made animated films and series are largely outsourced by companies in the United States and Japan. Only a few animated films and series are actually made specifically for Filipino audiences. A few of them have been released for film festivals competitions. In the past 2-3 years, the Filipino animation industry slowly began to create animations directed to Filipino audiences, such as Trese, although the number of films and series produced is still small compared to those produced by Japan, China, South Korea, and the United States. There is still an issue regarding the majority of Filipino animation studios who continue to outsource their talents to foreign film makers for non-Filipino audiences due to finances. Some Filipino studios and their talents have also been abused by big 'greedy' foreign animation studios.

Animation Council of the Philippines
The Animation Council of the Philippines, Inc. is the industry association and serves as the primary overseer and coordinator for Filipino animators. The council is a part of a bigger umbrella association coordinated by the Information Technology and Business Process Association of the Philippines. (IBPAP)

Filipino animation festival

The First Philippine animation festival was held in Pasay as an additional program of the 7th Philippine Graphic Expo of 2002 which featured 3D animation entries from De La Salle–College of Saint Benilde, University of the Philippines Diliman and Philippine Women's University via Artfarm and Animasia. It was College of St. Benilde's entry, Fiesta Karera that won the festival which was authored by Ervin Malicdem, Dante Tiongson, Mark Ylagan, Jonathan Wongkee, Jefferson Lim, Vincent Cheng, Gerard Cruzado, Justin Teh, and Ace Gatdula.Animahenasyon, a Filipinized contraction of animation and imagination'', is a Philippine animation festival established by the Animation Council of the Philippines. Its purpose is to recognize Filipino animators and their original works.

Education and editorial cartoons
In Davao, a Filipino English teacher named Leonila Liberato incorporated editorial cartoons, such as those from the Philippine Daily Inquirer, in her lesson plans for critical reading classes, resulting in her winning the Inquirer's Education (IIE) Lesson Plan Contest. Liberato's purpose was to acquaint Filipino students with current events and issues happening in the Philippines, and to promote a “higher order of thinking”, through editorial cartoons.

See also
Cartoon Network (Philippines)
List of Filipino comic creators
List of Filipino superheroes
List of Filipino supervillains

References

Philippine animation